Hanno Balitsch (born 2 January 1981) is a German retired footballer

Club career 
Balitsch was born in Alsbach-Hähnlein. In the 1999–2000 season, he transferred from his first team FC Alsbach to SV Waldhof Mannheim. In 2001–02 he moved to 1. FC Köln.

Rapid development with the team and consistent first team performances brought him to Bayer 04 Leverkusen for two million €. However, he was unable to assert himself within international competition. He saw the opportunity to move to a newly promoted team, FSV Mainz 05, where he moved during the 2004–05 season, and found form amongst the first team. The top league once again beckoned, and the former German Under-21 international moved to Hannover 96.

On 29 May 2010, Balitsch returned to his former club Bayer 04 Leverkusen, signing a two-year deal. He retired from the professional stage after more than 400 first and second level matches in 2016.

International career 
He has made one appearance for the German national team, coming on as a substitute in a friendly against Spain on 12 February 2003 in Palma de Mallorca.

References

External links 
 
 
 

1981 births
Living people
People from Darmstadt-Dieburg
Sportspeople from Darmstadt (region)
German footballers
Germany international footballers
Germany youth international footballers
Germany under-21 international footballers
Association football midfielders
Bundesliga players
2. Bundesliga players
SV Waldhof Mannheim players
1. FC Köln players
Bayer 04 Leverkusen players
1. FSV Mainz 05 players
Hannover 96 players
1. FC Nürnberg players
FSV Frankfurt players
Footballers from Hesse